Arshad Mehmood is a Pakistani singer. 

Many of his songs for the Pakistani film industry, Lollywood, have been popular. He won the Nigar Award for Best Playback Singer in 1992 and then again in 1996.

Super-hit film songs
 "Dekha Jo Chehra Tera Mausam Bhi Pyaara Laga", Sung by Arshad Mehmood, lyrics by Riaz ur Rehman Saghar and music by the renowned music composer Amjad Bobby in film Ghunghat (1996).
"Ho Sakay Tau Mera Eik Kaam Karo" Sung by Arshad Mehmood, lyrics by Saeed Gillani, music by M Arshad in film Dopatta Jal Raha Hai (1998).

References

External links
Arshad Mehmood Songs Collection at Indus Sound - Archived

Living people
Year of birth missing (living people)
20th-century Pakistani male singers
Nigar Award winners
Singers from Sindh
Pakistani playback singers